The Research Organization for Electronics and Informatics (OREI) is one of Research Organizations under the umbrella of the National Research and Innovation Agency (BRIN). On 24 January 2022, the formation of the agency is announced and to be formed on 1 February 2022. The organization is resulted from restructuration of Assessment and Application of Technology Research Organization-BPPT and Engineering Science Research Organization, with addition of Human Resources Research and Development Agency of the Ministry of Communication and Information Technology. OREI formation is finalized on 1 March 2022 and is functional since 4 March 2022 with inauguration of its first head, Budi Prawara.

Structure 
The structure of OREI is as follows:

 Office of the Head of OREI
 Research Center for Telecommunication
 Research Center for Electronics
 Research Center for Data and Information Sciences
 Research Center for Artificial Intelligence and Cybersecurity
 Research Center for Computing
 Research Center for Smart Mechatronics
 Research Groups

List of Heads

References 

Science and technology in Indonesia
Research institutes in Indonesia
2022 establishments in Indonesia
National Research and Innovation Agency